Plagiostropha rubrifaba is a species of sea snail, a marine gastropod mollusk in the family Drilliidae.

Description
The length of the shell attains 6 mm.

Distribution
This marine species occurs off Mactan Island, Cebu, the Philippines.

References

 Chino M. & Stahlschmidt P. (2010) New species of Plagiostropha (Gastropoda: Drillidae) from the Philippines and Japan. Visaya 2(6):82–87

External links
 

rubrifaba
Gastropods described in 2010